Stetler is a surname. Notable people with the surname include:

Bob Stetler (1952–1990), American soccer player
Stephen Stetler (born 1949), American politician

See also
Stelter